Fomes fomentarius (commonly known as the tinder fungus, false tinder fungus, hoof fungus, tinder conk, tinder polypore or ice man fungus) is a species of fungal plant pathogen found in Europe, Asia, Africa and North America. The species produces very large polypore fruit bodies which are shaped like a horse's hoof and vary in colour from a silvery grey to almost black, though they are normally brown. It grows on the side of various species of tree, which it infects through broken bark, causing rot. The species typically continues to live on trees long after they have died, changing from a parasite to a decomposer.

Though inedible, F. fomentarius has traditionally seen use as the main ingredient of amadou, a material used primarily as tinder, but also used to make clothing and other items. The 5,000-year-old Ötzi the Iceman carried four pieces of F. fomentarius, concluded to be for use as tinder. It also has medicinal and other uses. The species is both a pest and useful in timber production.

Taxonomy
The first scientific description of the fungus appeared in the literature in the 1753 Species Plantarum by Carl Linnaeus; he called it Boletus fomentarius. The specific epithet fomentarius is from the Latin fomentum, referring to tinder. The species has been described as a member of numerous different genera. In 1783, Jean-Baptiste Lamarck named the species Agaricus fomentarius in his Encyclopédie Méthodique: Botanique. In 1818, Georg Friedrich Wilhelm Meyer described Polyporus fomentarius in his Primitiae Florae Essequeboensis, and this name was sanctioned by Elias Magnus Fries in the 1821 publication of the first volume of his Systema Mycologicum. Fries later, in his 1849 Summa vegetabilium Scandinaviae, moved the species to the genus Fomes. Subsequent attempts to change the genus of the species have been unsuccessful; the species was named Placodes fomentarius by Lucien Quélet in 1886, Ochroporus fomentarius by Joseph Schröter in 1888 and Scindalma fomentarium by Otto Kuntze in 1898. In the twentieth century, Narcisse Théophile Patouillard named the species Ungulina fomentaria in 1900, and William Murrill twice reallocated the species; in 1903, he named it Elfvingia fomentaria and in 1914, he named it Elfvingiella fomentaria. In 1963, Shu Chün Teng named it Pyropolyporus fomentarius. These names are considered obligate synonyms; that is, different names for the same species based on a single description or specimen. In addition to the obligate synonyms, there are a number of taxonomic synonyms, whereby names have been described as separate species, but have come to be considered synonymous. The species is commonly known as the tinder fungus, hoof fungus, tinder polypore, ice man fungus or false tinder fungus.

Description

While typically shaped like a horse's hoof, it can also be more bracket-like with an umbonate attachment to the substrate. The species typically has broad, concentric ridges, with a blunt and rounded margin. The flesh is hard and fibrous, and a cinnamon brown colour. The upper surface is tough, bumpy, hard and woody, varying in colour, usually a light brown or grey. The margin is whitish during periods of growth. The underside has round pores of a cream colour when new, maturing to brown, though they darken when handled. The pores are circular, and there are 2–3 per millimetre.

The colouration and size of the fruit body can vary based on where the specimen has grown. Silvery-white, greyish and nearly black specimens have been known. The darkest fruit bodies were previously classified as Fomes nigricans, but this is now recognised as a synonym of Fomes fomentarius. The colour is typically lighter at lower latitudes and altitudes, as well as on fruit bodies in the Northern Hemisphere that grow on the south side of trees. However, studies have concluded that there is no reliable way to differentiate varieties; instead, the phenotypic differences can "be attributed either to different ecotypes or to interactions between the genotype and its environment".

Microscopic features

The spores are lemon-yellow in colour, and oblong-ellipsoid in shape. They measure 15–20 by 5–7 μm. The species has a trimitic hyphal structure (meaning that it has generative, skeletal and binding hyphae), with generative hyphae (hyphae that are relatively undifferentiated and can develop reproductive structures) with clamp connections.

Similar species
Fomes fomentarius can easily be confused with Phellinus igniarius, species from the genus Ganoderma and Fomitopsis pinicola. An easy way to differentiate F. fomentarius is by adding a drop of potassium hydroxide onto a small piece of the fruit body from the upper surface. The solution will turn a dark blood red if the specimen is F. fomentarius, due to the presence of the chemical fomentariol.

Habitat and distribution
Fomes fomentarius has a circumboreal distribution, being found in both northern and southern Africa, throughout Asia and into eastern North America, and throughout Europe, and is frequently encountered. F. fomentarius typically grows alone, but multiple fruit bodies can sometimes be found upon the same host trunk. The species most typically grows upon hardwoods. In northern areas, it is most common on birch, while, in the south, beech is more typical. In the Mediterranean, oak is the typical host. The species has also been known to grow upon maple, cherry, hickory, lime tree, poplar, willow, alder, hornbeam, sycamore, and even, exceptionally, softwoods, such as conifers.

Ecology

Fomes fomentarius is a stem decay plant pathogen. The species' mycelium penetrates the wood of trees through damaged bark or broken branches, causing rot in the host. It can grow on the bark wound, or even directly onto the bark of older or dead trees. The decayed wood shows black lines in the lightly coloured decayed areas; these are known as pseudosclerotic layers or demarcation lines. The lines are caused by enzymes called phenoloxidases, converting either fungus or plant matter into melanin. The lines are not an absolute identifier, as they can also occur in plants infected by Kretzschmaria deusta and some Armillaria species. Despite beginning as a parasite, the species is able to survive for a time (hastening decomposition) on fallen or felled trees as a saprotrophic feeder, and typically lives there for years, until the log is completely destroyed. It is also capable of colonising and breaking down pollen grains, giving it a second food source which is particular high in nitrogen. Infected trees become very brittle, and cracks can occur in the affected tree due to wind. F. fomentarius is particularly adept at moving between cracks on the tree without interruption. However, in addition to the obviously infected damaged trees, F. fomentarius is known to be an endophyte, meaning that healthy trees which are not sporting F. fomentarius fruit bodies could still be infected.

The fruit bodies are perennial, surviving for up to thirty years. The strongest growth period is between early summer and autumn. The yearly growth always occurs on the bottom of the fungus, meaning that the lowest layer is the youngest. This occurs even if the host tree has been laid on the forest floor, which can happen because of the white rot induced by the fungus. This is a process known as positive gravitropism. Very large numbers of spores are produced, particularly in spring, with up to 887 million basidiospores an hour being produced by some fruit bodies. Spore production also takes place in autumn, though not nearly as heavily. The spores are released at comparatively low temperatures. In dry weather, the spores are visible as a white powder.

Uses and importance

The species is not considered edible; the flesh has an acrid taste, with a slightly fruity smell. The fungus has economic significance; it depreciates timber value as the parasitic infection advances. Fomes fomentarius infects trees through damaged bark. It will often infect trees already weakened from beech bark disease and thus has the important and useful role of decomposing unusable timber.

Amadou

This species, as well as others such as Phellinus igniarius, can be used to make amadou, a material used as tinder, among other purposes. Amadou is produced from the flesh of the fungus fruit bodies. The young fruit bodies are soaked in water before being cut into strips, and are then beaten and stretched, separating the fibres. The resulting material is referred to as "red amadou". The addition of gunpowder or nitre produces an even more potent tinder. The flesh has further been used to produce clothing, including caps, gloves and breeches. Amadou was used medicinally by dentists, who used it to dry teeth, and surgeons, who used it as a styptic. It is still used today in fly fishing for drying flies. Other items of clothing and even picture frames and ornaments have been known to be made from the fungus in Europe, particularly Bohemia. The fungus is known to have been used as a firestarter in Hedeby, and it is known that the fungus was used as early as 3000 BCE. When found, the 5,000-year-old Ötzi the Iceman was carrying four pieces of F. fomentarius fruit body. Chemical tests led to the conclusion that he carried it for use as tinder.

See also
 Piptoporus betulinus also carried by Ötzi
 Forest pathology
 Ganoderma applanatum known as the artist's conk

References

Cited texts

External links

Polyporaceae
Fungi of Europe
Fungi of North America
Fungi of Africa
Fungi of Asia
Medicinal fungi
Fungal tree pathogens and diseases
Inedible fungi
Fungi described in 1753
Taxa named by Carl Linnaeus